X-Factor is the Armenian version of The X Factor, a show originating in the United Kingdom. It is a televised music talent show contested by aspiring pop singers drawn from public auditions in Armenia and the Armenian diaspora. The show in its inaugural year was broadcast on the Armenian Shant TV station, the same station that broadcasts the Armenian Idol series Hay Superstar.

Series overview
 Contestant in (or mentor of) "Boys" category
 Contestant in (or mentor of) "Girls" category
 Contestant in (or mentor of) "Over 25s" category
 Contestant in (or mentor of) "Groups" category

Judges' categories and their contestants

Key:
 – Winning judge/category. Winners are in bold, eliminated contestants in small font.

Season 1 (2010-2011)
The program was broadcast on Saturday nights at 22:30 with repetitions on Sundays, Mondays and Thursdays. Shant TV also broadcasts various chronicles and updates under the title "Oragir" on Tuesdays, Thursdays and Saturdays at 17:50 local time.

The first auditions were broadcast on Shant TV on 11 November 2010, with the eighth auditions on 25 December 2010.

Naira Gyurjinyan was assigned the Boys (16-25) category, Garik Paboyan the Girls (16-25), Egor Glumov the Groups, and Gisané Palyan the Over 25s.

Bootcamp and Judges' houses

At bootcamp stage, the candidates that were chosen for Judges' Houses were:
16-24 Boys (mentor Naira Gyurjinyan): Artsrun Khangeldyan, Arthur-Alek Tosbekian (born in Lebanon), Georgi Bunyatyan, Vahé Aleksanyan, Hayk Avetisyan, Gevorg Harutyunyan
16-24 Girls (mentor Garik Papoyan): Anoush, Arminé Kocharyan, Nelly Ghazaryan, Mariam, Sona, Srbuhi Sargsyan
Over 25 (mentor Gisané Palyan): Yeva, Edvin, Hayk, Nelly, Sona, Vrezh
Groups (mentor Egor Glumov): (6 groups) GigaBeat, P.S., Mars-On

At Judges' Houses (broadcast on 29 January and 5 February 2011), only 3 from each of the 4 categories continued on to the live shows. Naira Gyurjiniyan was assisted by Haik, Garik Papoyan by Gor Sujyan, Gisané Palyan by Sargis.

Contestants

Key:
 – Winner
 – Runner-up
 – Third Place
 – Withdrew

Live shows

Results summary

Contestants' colour key:

Season 2 (2012-2013)

Garik Papoyan was assigned the Boys category, André the Girls, Gisané Palyan the Groups, and Naira Gyurjinyan the Over 25s.

Contestants

Key:
 – Winner
 – Runner-up
 – Third Place

Live shows

Results summary

Contestants' colour key:

Season 3 (2014)

Simon Cowell made an appearance and told the judges what categories they would mentor.
André will be mentoring the Boys, Emmy has the Girls, Garik Papoyan will look after the Groups and Egor Glumov has been assigned the Over 24s.

Four-Chair challenge
For this season of The X Factor, Cowell confirmed that the boot camp and judges' houses sections of the competition, which traditionally followed the audition rounds, had been dropped and replaced with a brand new stage called "The Four-Chair challenge". Speaking on the change, he said "It [boot camp and Judges' houses] was the one element of the show I wasn't happy with, and it looked too similar to what everybody else is doing." He went on to describe the new "middle section" as "really dramatic, very tough on us and the contestants, and very high pressure", and compared the new round as similar to the live shows.

Key:
 – Contestant was immediately eliminated after performance without switch
 – Contestant was switched out later in the competition and eventually eliminated
 – Contestant was not switched out and made the final four of their own category

Contestants

Key:
 – Winner
 – Runner-up
 – Third Place

Live shows

Results summary

Contestants' colour key:

Live show details

Week 1 (Top 12 Finalists Chosen)
In this week each of the judges narrowing their number of acts down to three, without a public vote.

 After Glumov's decision Sargis pronounced that instead of him the show will continue with Anahit.

Week 2 (August 31)
Theme: The 2000s and 2010s hits
At the beginning of the show the producers sang the most sung songs on X Factor Armenia. Emmy performed "Feeling Good", Garik Papoyan "One Night Only", Egor Glumov "Im Sery Qez" (Իմ սերը քեզ) and André "I Believe I Can Fly".

Week 3 (September 7)
Theme: Love songs
At the beginning of the show the eliminated acts performed the songs that they would sing on the third live show. Anahit Yengibaryan performed "Woman in Love" and The Nanos "Don't You Remember".

Judges' votes to save
 Papoyan: Gagik Harutyunyan – gave no reason
 Emmy: Gagik Harutyunyan  – gave no reason
 André: Gagik Harutyunyan – gave no reason
 Glumov was not required to vote since there was already a majority

Week 4 (September 14)
Theme: The 1980s and 1990s hits

Judges' votes to save
 Papoyan: Mery Avetisyan
 André: Anahit Hakobyan
 Glumov: Anahit Hakobyan
 Emmy: Mery Avetisyan

Week 5 (September 21)
Theme: Patriotic Songs
Musical guests: Sona Rubenyan and Mher ("Hayastan")

Judges' votes to save
 Glumov: Gagik Harutyunyan
 Emmy: Mery Avetisyan
 Papoyan: Mery Avetisyan
 André: Gagik Harutyunyan

Week 6 (September 28)
Theme: The Armenian and foreign hits of last 10 years

Week 7 (October 5)
Theme: Retro songs
At the beginning of the show the eliminated acts performed the songs that they would sing on the seventh live show. MiKADO performed "Highway Star" and Mery Avetisyan "It's a Man's Man's Man's World".

Semifinal (October 19)
Themes: Celebrity duets, Soundtracks
During the show the eliminated DaDu performed the songs that they would sing on the eight live show. They performed "Not Alone" with Aram Mp3, and "Can't Hold Us".

Final (October 26)
Themes: Favorite performance, Winner's song
Duets: Narek Vardanyan and Hayk Hunanyan performed "Patker" (Պատկեր), Zhanna Davtyan and Vahé Margaryan "Say Something".
During the show the eliminated Zhanna Davtyan performed her own song written by Garik Papoyan. The song is called "Doors".

Season 4 (2016-2017)
For the first time in X Factor Armenia history, viewers voted on the official web page of Shant TV to determine which of the judges was allocated each of the four categories. The judges learnt the result during the four-chair challenge. André will be mentoring the Boys, Erik has the Girls, Garik Papoyan will look after the Groups and Shushanik Arevshatyan has been assigned the Over 22s.

Contestants
 – Winner
 – Runner-up
 – Third Place

Live shows

Results summary

Contestants' colour key:

See also
Hay Superstar (Idol series)

External links
X Factor website - Season 1
X Factor website - Season 2
X Factor website - Season 3
X Factor Facebook

Armenia
Armenian reality television series
Television series by Fremantle (company)
Non-British television series based on British television series
2010 Armenian television series debuts
2010s Armenian television series
Shant TV original programming

hy:Իքս-Ֆակտոր